Collateral damage is a U.S. military term for unintended or incidental damage during a military operation.

Collateral damage may also refer to:

Television 
 "Collateral Damage" (Edgemont), an episode of Edgemont
 "Collateral Damage" (Stargate SG-1), an episode of the science fiction television series Stargate SG-1
 "Collateral Damage" (The Wire), an episode of the HBO TV series The Wire
 "Collateral Damage" (Millennium), an episode of the HBO TV series Millennium
 An episode of NCIS
 An episode of CSI: Miami
 An episode of the science fiction television series The Pretender

Other fields 
 Collateral Damage (2002 film), an action film starring Arnold Schwarzenegger
 Collateral Damage (1993 film), a Canadian short drama film directed by Leonard Farlinger
 Collateral Damage, the sixth DC HeroClix set produced by WizKids
 "Collateral Damage", an instrumental solo by Muse from the album The Resistance
 "Collateral Damage", a song by Brutal Truth from the album Extreme Conditions Demand Extreme Responses